"I'll See It Through" is a single by Scottish band Texas and the second to be taken from their seventh studio album Careful What You Wish For. The song was released on 8 December 2003 and charted at #40 in the UK before falling to #57 in its second week then falling out the UK charts at #65. The song was also included in the 2003 film Love Actually as well as being included on the album release of the film's original soundtrack.

Track listing

CD1 (Enhanced) (9815220)
"I'll See It Through" (Radio Edit) – 3:28
"What Do I Get" – 3:05
"I'll Give It All Again" – 3:47
"I'll See It Through" (Roger Sanchez Remix) – 5:16
"I'll See It Through" (Guy Chambers Remix) – 4:04

CD2 (9815221)
"I'll See It Through" (Radio Edit) – 3:28
"Tired of Being Alone" – 3:17

Charts

References

2003 singles
Texas (band) songs
Songs written by Johnny McElhone
Songs written by Sharleen Spiteri
Songs written by Guy Chambers
2003 songs
Mercury Records singles
Rock ballads